Zug Island is a heavily industrialized island within the city of River Rouge at the southern city limits of Detroit in the U.S. state of Michigan. It is located where the mouth of the River Rouge spills into the Detroit River. Zug Island is not a natural island in the river; it was formed when a shipping canal was dug along the southwestern side of the island, allowing ships to bypass several hundred yards of twisting waterway near the mouth of the natural course of the lowest portions of the River Rouge.

History
Originally a marsh-filled peninsula at the mouth of the River Rouge, it served as an uninhabited Native American burial ground for thousands of years. Upon European arrival, the land was incorporated into Ecorse Township, making up the very northeast corner of the township. The beginning of interest in developing the land came when Samuel Zug, one of the founders of the Republican Party and a staunch abolitionist, came to Detroit from Cumberland County, Pennsylvania, in 1836 to make his fortune in the furniture industry with the money he earned as a bookkeeper. Shortly after, Marcus Stevenson, a Detroit financier, went into business with him.

The Stevenson & Zug Furniture Company flourished until 1859 when Zug, by then a rich man, dissolved the partnership. He decided to invest in real estate to provide security for his wife, Ann. Envisioning a luxurious estate on the Detroit River, Zug bought  of marshy land below Fort Wayne from the town of Delray in 1876. But the dampness was too much for the Zugs and after 10 years they abandoned their home.

In 1888, Zug allowed the River Rouge Improvement Company to cut a small canal through the south section of his property to more directly connect the Rouge River to the Detroit River. This Short Cut Canal, as it came to be known, was enlarged in the early 1920s by Henry Ford to allow large ships to more easily navigate to the Ford River Rouge Complex. In 1891, Zug completed the largest real estate transaction of the decade: he sold his island for $300,000 to industries that wanted it as a dumping ground.

Zug became interested in politics and served as Wayne County Auditor under Gov. John J. Bagley. He died in 1896 when he was 80.

Steel mill
The Detroit Iron Works brought ironmaking to Zug Island in 1901 with the commissioning of a blast furnace built in 1902. In 1904 the works was purchased by the M.A. Hanna Company of Cleveland, Ohio, which built a second blast furnace in 1909. At this time the island's two furnaces were reportedly the largest of their kind in the world, producing pig iron for foundry companies. The plant expanded and became part of the Great Lakes Steel Corporation in late 1931, becoming a key component of a fully integrated steel mill and a division of the larger National Steel Corporation. A third blast furnace was added in early 1938 while the existing furnaces were rebuilt and enlarged.

When National Steel became insolvent in 2003 most of the island's facilities were purchased, along with the rest of what is now called the Great Lakes Works, by United States Steel, which currently operates the mill. The island is home to the mill's ironmaking facilities (the rest of the mill's facilities, primarily steelmaking and processing, are located at the main plant a couple miles south in the city of Ecorse) which includes 3 blast furnaces ("A", "B" and "D") and raw materials storage areas. Ships supply large ore docks along the north ("1 Dock") and east ("3 Dock") shores of the island and large coal/coke/ore storage fields along the south and west ("B Area") shores. Number 5 Coke Battery located there, once an integral part of the mill, is independently owned and operated by EES Coke LLC, a DTE Energy company. Delray Connecting Railroad, a U.S. Steel company, also operates some rail facilities on the island. A "2-way" vehicle/rail bridge is the main access to the island. Secondary vehicle and rail bridges (the "Swing Bridge") at the southwestern corner of the island also allow mainland access.

Iron produced at Zug Island is transported in bottle cars via rail to steelmaking at the main plant while DTE's coke is shipped via rail to supply consumers, chiefly ISG/Mittal, in the merchant metallurgical market. During the industry's peak, thousands of workers were employed on the island with a large percentage of the downriver community supported by the local steel producer. Today a few hundred people work on the island with the hourly workers at U.S. Steel represented by United Steelworkers Local 1299. In fall of 2008 U.S. Steel halted its production due to the economic downturn, but restarted its production in fall of 2009.

U.S. Steel announced in December 2019 that they would idle most of its operations in the area, including all of its operations on Zug Island, by April 2020.

Wildlife

Despite the island's extremely developed industrial landscape, areas along the south and west shores are left undeveloped to provide habitat for wildlife. Foxes and once-endangered peregrine falcons, which frequent large outdoor structures such as the gantry cranes at the ore docks, thrive on the island and offshore. At the bottom of the Detroit River is a man-made bed of coal cinders which serves as a rare spawning site for lake sturgeon, a threatened species. Less desirable are the sizable and sometimes troublesome populations of gulls, feral cats and rats.

Environmental impact

One of the most pressing problems in the neighborhoods surrounding Zug Island is poor air quality. According to an article in the January 20, 2010, edition of the Detroit Free Press, the neighborhoods around the area compose six of the ten most polluted zip codes in Michigan. In the article, residents cite air quality samples containing lead and high levels of methyl ethyl ketone, large numbers of cancer and asthma cases, and foul smells with "sparkly" dust that must be removed with toilet cleaner. Interviewed separately, residents of the area say the foul smells are strong enough to cause dry heaves.

Noise and vibration
In 2011, the Zug Island area was identified by Canadian scientists and Ontario's Ministry of Natural Resources as the source of mysterious rumblings and vibrations, known as "The Hum", that have plagued hundreds of area residents with cyclical vibrations reportedly being felt in the ground up to fifty miles (eighty kilometres) away.

The city of River Rouge reported in the Star that it cannot afford to spend any more money on investigating the hum. They claim the City Council had already spent over $1 million to help Windsor and Ontario find the source of the noise. However, they say it likely comes from the steel mill facilities on the island.

, a Canadian scientist is using sound-level meters and a portable "pentangular array" of cameras and microphones to try to accurately identify the source of the sound, in order to know whom exactly to ask to fix it.

The results of the 2013 study were released on May 23, 2014. Although contemporaneous news reports claim the study confirmed that Zug Island was the source of the hum,

the report's findings actually state "the most probable source of the Hum points well to the South of Zug Island. The bulk of our observations from both stations do not support the hypothesis that the source of the Hum emanates from Zug Island."

Reports of the Hum ceased after the US Steel plant on Zug Island ceased operations in April 2020.

Miscellaneous
Due to its location and relative security—the island is off-limits to the public for the most part (cameras are prohibited on the premises so pictures of the area, except from the outside, are rare)—many urban legends exist regarding the island, the two most popular being that the island is home to a correctional facility or prison and that parts of the movie RoboCop were filmed there (due to its mention in the movie as the location). Neither claim is true as the island is not the location of any law enforcement or corrections facility. The steel mill shots in the movie were filmed at the old Wheeling-Pittsburgh Steel Corp.'s Monessen Works in Pennsylvania.

The SS Edmund Fitzgerald of Great Lakes shipwreck fame was laden with taconite destined for Zug Island on her fateful voyage in 1975.

In 2011, Detroit based author Gregory Fournier published his novel, Zug Island: A Detroit Riot Novel.

Zug Izland, a Detroit-based rock band in association with Insane Clown Posse, named themselves after the island and self describe their sound as "Juggalo Rock". ICP themselves have made references to Zug Island in their songs "The Shaggy Show", "In the Haughhh!" "Cotton Candy & Popsicles" and "Toxic Love".

See also

 Michigan, geography of

References

External links
Zug Island Photo Essay
U.S. Steel

Ford Motor Company
River islands of Michigan
Islands of the Detroit River
Islands of Wayne County, Michigan
Artificial islands of the United States
1888 establishments in Michigan